Jaywalker is the first solo album by singer/songwriter Josh Joplin.  Jaywalker was released on August 23, 2005 with Eleven Thirty Records

Track listing
All songs written by Josh Joplin
 "Mister New Years Day" – 3:29
 "Pilgrim's Progress" – 4:08
 "One Becomes Two" – 4:03
 "Jaywalkers Of The World" – 3:33
 "A Hard Year" – 3:59
 "The World On A Shoestring" – 3:54
 "To All My Friends" – 3:54
 "Arms To Hold Me" – 2:47
 "Empire State" – 4:02
 "Mortimer's Ghost" – 4:23
 "Stay" – 3:55

External links
 This album rated 'A' at Daily Vault.

2005 albums
Josh Joplin albums